David Katz Boysen (born 30 April 1991) is a Danish-Israeli professional footballer who plays as a left winger for Fremad Amager.

Career

AB
Boysen joined AB as a youth player from Herlev IF. He was invited on a trial at Italian club Reggina in December 2007 at the age of 16. Boysen was also on trials at Premier League clubs Liverpool and Chelsea. In February 2008, Boysen signed his first contract with AB until the summer of 2011. He was promoted to the first team in the summer of 2008. He was considered a promising talent and made his debut at the age of 17 in a match against Kolding FC in the Danish 1st Division, where he replaced Henrik Lyngsoe Olsen in the 85th minute on 10 August 2008. He scored his first senior goal in his third game for the first team against FC Roskilde in the Danish Cup on 24 August 2008. Boysen was nominated for "Talent of the Year" 2008 by the Danish Football Association. Boysen made 24 league appearances and scored 8 goals in his first season despite his young age, and was shown interest by clubs from both the Netherlands and Germany.

After a one-week trial at Celtic in January 2010, he was linked with a move to the Scottish club. He played a friendly match for Celtic, and scored after five minutes. However, his agent later revealed that Boysen was not in top shape due to the winter break in Denmark, and therefore the club did not offer him a contract.

After a strong first half to the 2010–11 season, with 16 league appearances, 4 goals and 4 assists, he signed with Lyngby Boldklub. He played a total of 63 games for the first team.

Lyngby
Lyngby announced on 31 January 2011 that they had signed Boysen from AB on a contract valid from the summer 2011. The following day, however, Lyngby confirmed that Boysen instead would join the club with immediate effect. He made his first appearance for Lyngby on 14 March 2011 against OB, in a game which Lyngby lost 0–2. He scored his first goal for the club in his second game, a match against AaB.

In 2012, Israeli club Hapoel Tel Aviv attempted to bring Boysen and Swiss defender, Guillaume Katz, in on loan as the club was trying to strengthen their squad targeting Jewish footballers. He went on a trial at the club but decided to stay at Lyngby.

After three good seasons at Lyngby, Boysen was followed by Danish Superliga clubs. According to some media, Boysen was in negotiations with Esbjerg fB. Lyngby offered him a contract extension, but he rejected it and announced on 8 January 2014, that he would be leaving the club immediately.

Viborg
Boysen signed with Viborg FF on 13 January 2014 on a free transfer. He played his first game for the club on 23 February against Randers FC. It was head coach Ove Christensen that wanted to transfer Boysen to Viborg, but after Ove Christensen left the club and was replaced by Auri Skarbalius, Boysen found it hard to become a regular part of the squad, after he played 7 games from start and one from the bench, without scoring any goals. After a disappointing first half season, he left the club.

Return to Lyngby
Lyngby announced on 27 June 2014, that they had signed Boysen back on a two-year contract. Boysen's first season back at Lyngby, was an extraordinary season. He was named as the profile of the year in the Danish 1st Division after only six months in the league. He scored 12 goals in 24 league games before getting injured for the rest of the season in May 2015.

In the next season, he became the profile of the year in the Danish 1st Division once again. With 18 league games and 11 goals, he was sold in January 2016.

Brøndby
Boysen signed with Brøndby IF on 25 January 2016 and was reunited with his former manager from Viborg FF, Auri Skarbalius. He made his debut for Brøndby on 28 February against Hobro IK. Boysen played well during the spring, which aroused interest from foreign clubs.

Roda JC
On 8 July 2016 after only six months in Brøndby IF, Boysen was sold to Dutch club Roda JC. In December 2016 Boysen revealed, that he wasn't happy at the club due to the team's results which affected his stay in the Netherlands.

After 13 league games and 1 goal, Boysen's contract was terminated.

Third period at Lyngby
Despite the interest from Beitar Jerusalem and Hammarby IF, Boysen signed for Lyngby for the third time in February 2017. After his transfer to Lyngby he revealed that he had rejected foreign clubs that offered him millions in sign fee.

Journeyman years
On 7 December 2017, he signed with Israeli Premier League club Beitar Jerusalem. On 8 January 2018, he made his debut for the team in a 2–0 victory over Hapoel Haifa. In total, he appeared in seven games in all competitions for Beitar Jerusalem, before being released at the end of the 2017–18 season. On 11 August 2018, Boysen moved to IF Elfsborg in Allsvenskan, Sweden's first tier, on a one and a half-year contract. Boysen's contract was terminated on 31 January 2019. On 15 February 2019, Helsingborgs IF announced the signing of Boysen on a free transfer for two year with an option to extend the deal with further one year.

On 11 September 2019, Boysen returned to Israel and signed with Sektzia Ness Ziona He was released from the club on 7 January 2020 after appearing in only 140 minutes spread over five league games, in which he scored one goal. On 29 January 2020, Boysen signed with Israeli Liga Leumit club Hapoel Nof HaGalil, his sixth club in only 25 months. He made his debut for the club on 31 January in a 1–1 away draw against Hapoel Ramat Gan Givatayim where he appeared as a starter. He scored his first goal for Hapoel Nof HaGalil on 21 February against Hapoel Afula in a 3–2 away loss for the team. Boysen left the club in July 2020, after a period which he described as "complete chaos", claiming that he only received 30% of his salary.

Helsingør
Boysen returned to Denmark in August 2020, signing with newly promoted Danish 1st Division club FC Helsingør. The move marked his thirteenth club in nine years. He made his debut for the club on 2 September 2020 in a Danish Cup match against sixth-tier Series 1 club Bispebjerg Boldklub, which ended in a shocking 3–2 loss. Boysen made his league debut on 9 September in a 4–2 home game against Silkeborg, coming on as a substitute in the 85h minute.

Fremad Amager
On 16 June 2021 Fremad Amager confirmed, that Boysen had signed a two-year deal with the club.

Personal life
Boysen's father is from Israel.

References

External links
 

1991 births
Living people
Danish expatriate men's footballers
Footballers from Copenhagen
Association football wingers
Danish men's footballers
Jewish footballers
Jewish Danish sportspeople
Lyngby Boldklub players
Akademisk Boldklub players
Viborg FF players
Brøndby IF players
Roda JC Kerkrade players
Beitar Jerusalem F.C. players
IF Elfsborg players
Helsingborgs IF players
Sektzia Ness Ziona F.C. players
Hapoel Nof HaGalil F.C. players
FC Helsingør players
Fremad Amager players
Danish Superliga players
Eredivisie players
Israeli Premier League players
Allsvenskan players
Liga Leumit players
People from Herlev Municipality
Danish 1st Division players
Herlev IF players
Danish people of Israeli descent
Denmark youth international footballers
Danish expatriate sportspeople in the Netherlands
Danish expatriate sportspeople in Israel
Expatriate footballers in Israel
Expatriate footballers in Sweden
Expatriate footballers in the Netherlands
Danish expatriate sportspeople in Sweden